Victor Coleman (born September 9, 1944) is a Canadian poet.

Biography
Born in Toronto, Coleman was the first editor at Coach House Books from 1966 until 1975. After his tenure in publishing, he managed the multidisciplinary art centre, A Space in Toronto for four years. He has also taught film studies at Queen's University and creative writing at York University.

Bibliography 

Old Friends' Ghosts: Poems 1963-68 (1970)
Terrific at Both Ends (1978)
Captions for the Deaf (1979)
From the Dark Wood (1985)
Corrections (1985)
Lapsed WASP (1994)
The Exchange: Poems 1984-95 (1999)
LETTER DROP (2000)
Honeymoon Suite/ Letter Drop (2001)
MI SING (2004)
Icon Tact (2006)
Driven To Our Knees (2008)
Mal Arme: Letter to Drop III (2008)
The Occasional Troubadour (2010)
O - Three Lectures and a Postscript (2010)
IvH: An Alphamath Serial (2012)
Miserable Singers: Book One (2014)

See also

Canadian literature
Canadian poetry
List of Canadian poets

References

External links
 (The Toronto New School of Writing)
Coleman, The Canadian Encyclopedia
 (Reading of The Occasional Troubadour)
Records of Victor Coleman are held by Simon Fraser University's Special Collections and Rare Books
Archives of Victor Coleman (Victor Coleman fonds, R11721) are held at Library and Archives Canada

1944 births
Living people
Canadian male poets
Academic staff of Queen's University at Kingston
Academic staff of York University
Writers from Toronto
20th-century Canadian poets
20th-century Canadian male writers
21st-century Canadian poets
Canadian editors
21st-century Canadian male writers